Laurent Stocker (born 27 May 1973) is a French theatre and cinema actor, and a sociétaire of the Comédie-Française.

Life and career 
He trained at the Ateliers   Gérard Philipe and the Conservatoire national supérieur d'art dramatique from 1993 to 1996 in the classes of Madeleine Marion, Daniel Mesguich and Philippe Adrien.

He entered the Comédie-Française on 14 June 2001, where he became the 511th sociétaire on 1 January 2004.

He starred in, among other films, Ensemble, c'est tout by Claude Berri, after the novel of the same name by Anna Gavalda, a role for which he was nominated for the César Award for Most Promising Actor on 22 February 2008. He also starred in Le code a changé by Danièle Thompson with Dany Boon and Karin Viard, and also in Cyprien with Elie Semoun and Catherine Deneuve.

He is also a Chevalier des Arts et Lettres.

Filmography 
 Cinema
 2005 : Saint-Jacques… La Mecque by Coline Serreau
 2005 : Aux abois by Philippe Collin
 2007 : Miss Oliver a filé à l'anglaise (project) by Claude Zidi
 2007 : Ensemble, c'est tout by Claude Berri
 2009 : Change of Plans by Danièle Thompson
 2009 : Cyprien by David Charhon
 2009 : Je ne dis pas non by Iliana Lolic
 2011 : The Art of Love by Emmanuel Mouret
 2011 : The Minister by Pierre Schoeller (acting Yan)
 2011 : Nuit Blanche by Frédéric Jardin
 2014: 1001 Grams
 2014: Brèves de comptoir by Jean-Michel Ribes
 2015: Chic! by Jérôme Cornuau
 2015: Caprice by Emmanuel Mouret
 2015: Love at First Child by Anne Giafferi
 2016: Cézanne and I by Danièle Thompson
 2017: Garde alternée by Alexandra Leclère
 2018: The Summer House by Valeria Bruni Tedeschi
 2020: Villa Caprice by Bernard Stora

 Television
 2009 : Un homme d'honneur by Laurent Heynemann
 2009 : Envoyez la fracture in the Suite noire collection by Claire Devers
 2010 : Contes et nouvelles du XIXe siècle : L'Écornifleur by Jean-Charles Tacchella
 2010 : Fracture by Alain Tasma
 2023 : Bardot by Danièle Thompson and Christopher Thompson

Theatre 
 1992 : Un fil à la patte by Georges Feydeau, directed by Philippe Duclos
 1996 : La Cour des comédiens by Antoine Vitez, directed by Georges Lavaudant, Festival d'Avignon
 1996 : Six fois deux, directed by Georges Lavaudant
 1997 : Histoires de France by Michel Deutsch and Georges Lavaudant, directed by Georges Lavaudant, Théâtre de l'Odéon
 1997 : Ulysse Matériaux, directed by Georges Lavaudant
 1999 : Saint Joan of the Stockyards by Bertolt Brecht, directed by Alain Milianti
 1999 : Victor ou les Enfants au pouvoir by Roger Vitrac, directed by Philippe Adrien
 1999 : Les Muses orphelines by Michel-Marc Bouchard, directed by Isabelle Ronayette
 1999 : Henry V by William Shakespeare, directed by Jean-Louis Benoit, Théâtre de l'Aquarium
 2001 : Le Balcon by Jean Genet, directed by Jean Boillt, Festival d'Avignon
 2001 : La Fille que j’aime written and directed by Guillaume Hasson
 2001 : Les Parfums du cheik written and directed by Fawzi Ben Saidi
 2001 : Cymbeline by William Shakespeare, directed by Mario Gonzalez
 2001 : Henri VI by William Shakespeare, directed by Nadine Varoutsikos
 2001 : Lenz, Léonce et Léna, directed by Matthias Langhoff
 2001 : Henri VI by William Shakespeare, directed by Nadine Varoutsikos
 2001 : Le Malade imaginaire by Molière, directed by Claude Stratz
 2001 : Le Bourgeois gentilhomme by Molière, directed by Jean-Louis Benoit
 2001 : Ruy Blas by Victor Hugo, directed by Brigitte Jaques-Wajeman
 2001 : Le Dindon by Georges Feydeau, directed by Lukas Hemleb
 2001 : Fables de La Fontaine by Jean de La Fontaine, directed by Bob Wilson, Comédie-Française
 2003 : La Forêt by Alexander Ostrovsky, directed by Pyotr Fomenko
 2008 : Trois Hommes dans un salon by François-René Christiani, directed by Anne Kessler, Studio-Théâtre de la Comédie-Française : Léo Ferré
 2008 : Juste la fin du monde by Jean-Luc Lagarce, directed by  Michel Raskine, Antoine
 2008 : Le Mariage de Figaro by Beaumarchais, directed by Christophe Rauck : Figaro
 2009 : Les Précieuses ridicules by Molière, directed by Dan Jemmett, Théâtre du Vieux-Colombier : Jodelet and Du Croisy
 2009 : Quatre pièces de Georges Feydeau, directed by Gian Manuel Rau, Théâtre du Vieux-Colombier
 2009 : Amour et Piano : Édouard
 2009 : Fiancés en herbe : René
 2009 : Feu la mère de madame : Lucien
 2010 : Three Sisters (play) by Anton Chekhov, directed by Alain Françon
 2011 : Three Sisters (play) by Anton Chekhov, directed by Alain Françon

Awards and nominations 
 2008 : Nominated for César Award for Best Supporting Actor for Ensemble, c'est tout
 2008 : César Award for Most Promising Actor for Ensemble, c'est tout
 2008 : Nominated for Molière Award for Best Supporting Actor for Juste la fin du monde

References

External links 
 
 Laurent Stocker at the Comédie-Française

1973 births
Living people
People from Saint-Dizier
French male stage actors
Sociétaires of the Comédie-Française
Officiers of the Ordre des Arts et des Lettres
Most Promising Actor César Award winners
French male film actors
French National Academy of Dramatic Arts alumni
20th-century French male actors
21st-century French male actors
French male television actors